Lee Edward Geyer (September 9, 1888 – October 11, 1941) was an American educator and World War I veteran who served as a U.S. Representative from California from 1939 to 1941. He died in office during his only term in Congress.

Biography 
Born in Wetmore, Kansas, Geyer attended the public schools.
He was graduated from Baker University, Baldwin City, Kansas, in 1922 and afterwards did post-graduate work at the University of Wisconsin–Madison and the University of Southern California at Los Angeles.
He was a teacher in the rural schools in Nemaha County, Kansas from 1908 to 1912 and principal of Hamlin (Kansas) High School between 1916 and 1918.
During the First World War served as a private in the Third Company, First Battalion, Central Officers' Training School, Camp Grant, Illinois.
He was a teacher and administrator in high schools in Kansas, Arizona and California from 1919 to 1938.
He served as member of the State Assembly from 1935 to 1937.
He was an unsuccessful candidate for election in 1936 to the Seventy-fifth Congress.

Congress 
Geyer was elected as a Democrat to the Seventy-sixth and Seventy-seventh Congresses and served from January 3, 1939, until his death. He authored the first anti-poll tax legislation which had not passed at the time of his death but was continued by others to become the 24th Amendment to the US Constitution.
He served as delegate to the Democratic National Convention at Chicago in 1940.

Death 
He died in Washington, D.C., October 11, 1941 from pneumonia.
He was interred in Wetmore Cemetery, Wetmore, Kansas.

See also
 List of United States Congress members who died in office (1900–49)

References

Specific

External links

Join California Lee E. Geyer

1888 births
1941 deaths
Democratic Party members of the United States House of Representatives from California
United States Army soldiers
Democratic Party members of the California State Assembly
20th-century American politicians
University of Wisconsin–Madison alumni
University of Southern California alumni
Baker University alumni
People from Nemaha County, Kansas
Deaths from pneumonia in Washington, D.C.
Deaths from bronchopneumonia
United States Army personnel of World War I